Even Though the Whole World Is Burning is a feature documentary film about former United States Poet Laureate and environmental activist W. S. Merwin. The film is directed and produced by Stefan Schaefer, and screened at, among others, the Maui Film Festival, DOXA Documentary Film Festival, Environmental Film Festival in the Nation's Capital, Seattle International Film Festival, and the Hawaii International Film Festival.

W.S. Merwin: To Plant a Tree
W.S. Merwin: To Plant a Tree is a one-hour documentary edited from Even Though the Whole World Is Burning, produced by Cicala Filmworks and WNET, and directed by Stefan Schaefer, specifically for national broadcast on PBS. It screened widely at film festivals.

References

External links

 Even Though the Whole World is Burning - Website

2014 films
Documentary films about poets
American documentary films
2014 documentary films
Documentary films about environmental issues
Films directed by Stefan Schaefer
2010s American films